The Brown Derby is a 1926 American silent comedy film directed by Charles Hines and starring Johnny Hines, Ruth Dwyer, and Edmund Breese. A young plumber inherits a brown Derby hat from his uncle, which is said to bring good luck to its owner. While wearing it fortune does seem to smile on him, although it is in fact a case of mistaken identity.

Cast

Preservation
The film survives in the archives of the Museum of Modern Art (MOMA), UCLA Film and Television Archive, and National Archives of Canada.

References

Bibliography
 Munden, Kenneth White. The American Film Institute Catalog of Motion Pictures Produced in the United States, Part 1. University of California Press, 1997.

External links

1926 films
1926 comedy films
Silent American comedy films
Films directed by Charles Hines
American silent feature films
1920s English-language films
First National Pictures films
Silent films in color
American black-and-white films
1920s American films